The Deadnotes are a pop punk band from Freiburg in Germany founded in 2011 by Jakob Walheim (bassist) and Darius Lohmüller (guitarist). They asked their friend Yannic Arens to join the band as a drummer. The Deadnotes have toured Europe extensively and released two full length records. Since 2018 the band runs their own independent record label 22Lives Records.

Biography 
The Deadnotes are a pop punk band from Freiburg in Germany founded in 2011 by Jakob Walheim (bassist) and Darius Lohmüller (guitarist). They asked their childhood friend Yannic Arens to join the band as a drummer.

In 2013, the band released their debut EP Smiling Faces and started their first European tour in October.

In 2014, the band recorded a single Broken Thumbs & Sleepless Nights at Proudly Ugly Studio in Freiburg in Germany. The Deadnotes played several shows all over Europe (Spain, Portugal, Denmark, The Netherlands, United Kingdom, Czech Republic, Slovenia).

In 2015, the band toured in Russia and the Ukraine for 19 days in October and November. That same year they released a split with the band Casually Dressed called A Long Way Split.

In 2016, the band toured in Scandinavia and played their longest tour to date in July and August, including some shows with the American band Such Gold. The Deadnotes released their debut album I'll Kiss All Fears Out Of Your Face through Krod Records, Smithsfoodgroup Diy, Laserlife Records and Sugarferry Records and tours over Germany, Switzerland, France and Austria to promote this album.

In 2017, the band toured with Beach Slang in Germany and in March, embarked on a tour with Smile and Burn.

Discography

Singles 
 Broken Thumbs & Sleepless Nights, DL, 2014
 1.20, DL, 2017
 Cling to You, DL, 2018
 Makeup, DL, 2019
 Hopeless Romantic, DL, 2019
 Never Perfect, DL, 2020
 Ghost on the Ceiling, DL, 2020
 Easy Summer, DL, 2021
 Deer in the Headlights, DL 2021

Albums/Eps 
 Smiling Faces, CD/DL, 2013
 A Long Way Split with Casually Dressed, CD/DL, Sugarferry Records, 2015
 I'll Kiss All Fears Out Of Your Face, CD/LP/DL, Krod Records, Smithsfoodgroup Diy, Laserlife Records, Sugarferry Records, 2016
 Courage 2020
 Easy Summer / Deer in the Headlights 7'' Vinyl 2020

References 

German punk rock groups